Deutz may refer to:

People 
 Emmanuel Deutz (1763–1842), German-born French rabbi
 Rupert of Deutz, (–), Benedictine theologian and writer
 Simon Deutz (1802–1852), German-born French courtier

Places 
 Deutz, Cologne, a former town, since 1888 a quarter of Cologne, Germany
 Deutz Abbey, a Benedictine abbey in Cologne, Germany
 Deutz–Gießen railway, a line between Deutz and Gießen
 Deutz Station, after 2004 Köln Messe/Deutz station, a railway junction in Cologne, Germany.
 Deutz Suspension Bridge, former bridge in Cologne destroyed in World War II.

Companies 
 Deutz AG, a diesel-engine manufacturer based in Cologne, Germany
 Deutz-Allis, former subsidiary in North America. 
 Deutz-Fahr, a brand of tractors and other farm equipment established in 1968.
 Deutz Power Systems, former subsidiary (1985–2007) today part of Caterpillar Energy Solutions.
 Deutz (wine), a champagne bottler based in France, also known as Deutz Geldermann